The Bohdašín Formation (Czech: Bohdašínské souvrství) is a geologic unit of Late Triassic age (about 210 Ma), located in the Czech Republic. A small tridactyl footprint of a coelophysoid theropod or an indeterminate dinosauromorph was found around 1995 near Červený Kostelec in these strata. It was classified as ichnogenus Eubrontes. In 2011, another dinosaur footprint was discovered (in Botanical garden of Prague, but on the stone slab carried from this quarry), this time classified as ichnogenus Anomoepus.

References 

Geologic formations of the Czech Republic
Triassic System of Europe
Norian Stage
Sandstone formations
Ichnofossiliferous formations
Paleontology in the Czech Republic